Victor Guerin may also refer to:

Victor Guérin (1821–1891), French archaeologist
Victor Guerin (racing driver) (born 1992), Brazilian racing driver